Marco Alexandre Saraiva da Silva (born 12 July 1977) is a Portuguese football manager and former player who played as a right-back. He is the head coach of  club Fulham.

He played for a variety of Portuguese clubs, finishing his career with a six-year spell at Estoril. He managed them for three years before spending a season as coach of Sporting CP, during which the team won the Portuguese Cup. He then worked abroad, first with Olympiacos where he won the Super League Greece in 2015–16. He spent several years in England as head coach of Hull City, Watford, Everton and Fulham.

Playing career
Born in Lisbon, Silva developed into a professional footballer with local C.F. Os Belenenses. In a 15-year career he only appeared in two Primeira Liga games, one with that club and another with S.C. Campomaiorense. From 2000 to 2005 he alternated between the second and third divisions, representing C.D. Trofense, Rio Ave FC, S.C. Braga B, S.C. Salgueiros and Odivelas FC.

In the 2005 off-season, Silva joined G.D. Estoril Praia, where he remained until his retirement six years later, always in the second tier. He played his last match on 2 January 2011, a 0–1 home loss against F.C. Penafiel in the group stage of the Taça da Liga.

Silva retired in June at the age of 34, amassing second-division totals of 152 games and two goals for three clubs.

Coaching career

Estoril
On 10 June 2011, immediately after retiring, Silva was appointed director of football at Estoril. However, early into the season, he replaced Vinícius Eutrópio as manager, with the Cascais team ranking tenth in the second tier. His first game in charge was a 1–3 defeat at Penafiel and, after losing only three matches in 24, he helped the club return to the top flight after seven years, as champions. He ultimately was chosen as the league's Manager of the Year.

Silva made his debut in the Portuguese top division on 17 August 2012, in a 1–2 away defeat to S.C. Olhanense. Estoril overachieved for a second best-ever fifth place in the table, with the subsequent qualification to the UEFA Europa League, also a first. Highlights included not losing any of the games against Sporting CP (3–1 at home, 2–2 away), and drawing 1–1 at S.L. Benfica.

On 23 February 2014, Estoril achieved an historic first-time win at the Estádio do Dragão, the 1–0 victory – where he was sent off midway through the second half – being FC Porto's first home defeat since the 2–3 against Leixões S.C. in 2008. He left his position on 12 May, after leading his team to the fourth position.

Sporting CP
Silva agreed to a four-year contract with Sporting on 21 May 2014, replacing Leonardo Jardim who left for AS Monaco FC. He led the team to the third place in the championship, also winning the Taça de Portugal by beating S.C. Braga 3–1 on penalties after a 2–2 draw in the final– this was the club's first piece of silverware since the 2008 Supertaça Cândido de Oliveira.

On 4 June 2015, four days after winning the trophy, Sporting announced that Silva had been dismissed with just cause, for not wearing their official suit in a cup match against F.C. Vizela. The dismissal was necessary for president Bruno de Carvalho to bring in Jorge Jesus from rivals Benfica, and included a clause requiring Silva to pay Sporting should he join another Portuguese team.

Olympiacos
On 8 July 2015, Silva was appointed the successor of countryman Vítor Pereira at Olympiacos FC, signing on a two-year contract. His first competitive game occurred in the season opener in the Super League Greece, won 3–0 against Panionios FC. On 16 September, he played his first UEFA Champions League match with his new club, losing 0–3 at home to FC Bayern Munich in the group stage.

Silva subsequently guided the team to break the record of 11 consecutive league wins from the first matchday, also recording a 3–2 victory at Arsenal in the Champions League group phase. The Piraeus side's run of domestic wins ended at 17, a European record in the 21st century, but they nonetheless won a record 43rd title with six games remaining.

Silva left Olympiacos on 23 June 2016, citing personal reasons.

Hull City
On 5 January 2017, Silva was appointed as the head coach of Hull City until the end of the season, replacing Mike Phelan who was dismissed with the team bottom of the Premier League. Upon his appointment, vice-chairman Ehab Allam said: "He has a great track record and we feel this is a bold and exciting appointment in our aim to retain the club's Premier League status". Silva brought in his own coaching team, including assistant João Pedro Sousa, first-team coach Gonçalo Pedro and goalkeeping coach Hugo Oliveira.

Two days after his appointment, Silva coached the side to a 2–0 win over Swansea City in the third round in the FA Cup. His first league match in charge of Hull also ended in success, with a 3–1 win over AFC Bournemouth on 14 January.

On 26 January 2017, Silva's Hull beat Manchester United 2–1 in the semi-finals of the EFL Cup, giving the club its first victory over that opponent since 1974. However, due to the latter's 2–0 win in the first-leg of the tie, the former failed to advance to the final, but on 4 February they beat Liverpool 2–0 in the domestic league, giving the coach four wins from his first four home matches as manager.

In March 2017, Silva stated that he wanted to end the groundshare agreement with rugby league club Hull F.C. at the KCOM Stadium, as the latter played on Friday and affected the pitch quality for his team at the weekend. On 25 May, after the team's relegation, he resigned.

Watford

On 27 May 2017, it was confirmed Silva would join Premier League club Watford as head coach on a two-year contract. After a good start to the season, he was tracked for the vacant managerial position at Everton in November. During this period and in the subsequent two months, the team's performances became increasingly poor (five points from 30 in ten Premier League matches), with fans citing his loss of focus as putting them at risk of relegation.

Silva was dismissed by Watford on 21 January 2018, with the club citing the "unwarranted approach by a Premier League rival" that caused "significant deterioration in both focus and results to the point where the long-term future of Watford FC has been jeopardised". In February, Everton agreed to pay £4 million in compensation in response to this claim.

Everton
Silva was confirmed as manager of Everton on 31 May 2018, on a three-year contract. His first game in charge was a 22–0 win in a pre-season friendly over Austrian amateurs ATV Irdning.

On 21 April 2019, Silva guided his side to a 4–0 victory over Manchester United, making this the Toffees' largest  victory over that opposition in all competitions since a 5–0 victory in October 1984. His first season at Goodison Park ended with an eighth-place finish, the same position that they achieved under Sam Allardyce a year earlier.

Silva was dismissed on 5 December 2019, after a 5–2 defeat to city rivals Liverpool which left the team in 18th place.

Fulham
On 1 July 2021, Silva was appointed as head coach at recently relegated Championship club Fulham on a three-year contract, after Scott Parker had left to join Bournemouth. After leading them to 13 points out of a possible 15 in the first five matches of the season, he won the Manager of the Month award for August. In January 2022, the Craven Cottage club scored 19 goals over three matches, making them the first English team since Chester City in 1933 to score six times or more in three consecutive fixtures; as a result, he earned another monthly accolade. On 19 April, the side secured an immediate return to the top division after a 3–0 win over Preston North End, confirming the league title two weeks later after beating Luton Town 7–0 and totalling 106 goals, a competition-best after Manchester City's 108 in 2001–02.

Managerial statistics

Honours

Manager
Estoril
Segunda Liga: 2011–12

Sporting CP
Taça de Portugal: 2014–15

Olympiacos
Super League Greece: 2015–16

Fulham
EFL Championship: 2021–22

Individual
Segunda Liga Coach of the Year: 2011–12
EFL Championship Manager of the Month: August 2021, January 2022
EFL Championship Manager of the Year: 2021–22

References

External links

1977 births
Living people
Portuguese footballers
Footballers from Lisbon
Association football defenders
Primeira Liga players
Liga Portugal 2 players
Segunda Divisão players
C.D. Cova da Piedade players
C.F. Os Belenenses players
Atlético Clube de Portugal players
C.D. Trofense players
S.C. Campomaiorense players
Rio Ave F.C. players
S.C. Braga B players
S.C. Salgueiros players
Odivelas F.C. players
G.D. Estoril Praia players
Portuguese football managers
Primeira Liga managers
Liga Portugal 2 managers
G.D. Estoril Praia managers
Sporting CP managers
Super League Greece managers
Olympiacos F.C. managers
Premier League managers
English Football League managers
Hull City A.F.C. managers
Watford F.C. managers
Everton F.C. managers
Fulham F.C. managers
Portuguese expatriate football managers
Expatriate football managers in Greece
Expatriate football managers in England
Portuguese expatriate sportspeople in Greece
Portuguese expatriate sportspeople in England